is a Japanese footballer currently playing as a midfielder for Zweigen Kanazawa.

Career statistics

Club
.

Notes

References

External links

1997 births
Living people
Japanese footballers
Association football midfielders
Kanazawa Seiryo University alumni
J2 League players
Hokkaido Consadole Sapporo players
Zweigen Kanazawa players